Apoptygma Berzerk (commonly abbreviated to APB or APOP) is a Norwegian musical group. They have achieved success with a brand of synth-pop, and ballads backed with electronic rhythms, commonly known within the scene and referring to themselves as "futurepop". Apoptygma Berzerk has over 30 releases and won awards and Top 10 spots in Germany and Scandinavia. Apoptygma Berzerk has toured Europe, North America, South America, Israel and Australia with bands such as VNV Nation, Beborn Beton, Icon of Coil and Unheilig.

Formation 
The band was formed by Stephan Groth and Jon Erik Martinsen in 1989. One of the songs they wrote together, "Ashes To Ashes" would later be released as a 12-inch single on the Norwegian label Tatra Productions in 1991. Martinsen left the band due to creative differences. The name "Apoptygma Berzerk" has no particular meaning; frontman and founding member Stephan Groth claims that it was randomly picked out of a dictionary (the first word being derived from the Ancient Greek word ἀπόπτυγμα meaning "piece of a tunic").

Influences and style 
Groth has cited influences including Kraftwerk, Tangerine Dream, Orchestral Manoeuvres in the Dark (OMD), Jean-Michel Jarre and John Carpenter. The first two albums, Soli Deo Gloria and 7, were a similar style of electropop and EBM. Welcome to Earth eschewed the dark themes of 7 for a lighter, less aggressive sound, and included a few experimental tracks. Harmonizer featured a softer, more synthpop-oriented direction when compared to previous albums, and their 2006 album, You and Me Against the World, represented an almost complete change in style for the band. It featured a more mainstream, indie rock-oriented sound, and the complete departure from the band's traditional electric synthpop and EBM roots that started with 7. With the release of latest album, Rocket Science, Apop is still going on the rock vibe while keeping synthpop sounds like its predecessor, YAMATW.

Many albums feature a hidden track that can be accessed by fast forwarding through many minutes of silence on the last album track. For instance, on 7, one can hear a remix of Nonstop Violence after Love Never Dies (Part II).

The band also features cover songs on several of their albums. For example, on the American version of 7 a cover of "Electricity" by OMD is featured; similarly, Welcome to Earth features a cover of Metallica's "Fade to Black".  You and Me Against the World has a cover of "Cambodia"  by Kim Wilde and "Shine On"  by The House Of Love. They have also recorded covers of Depeche Mode's "Enjoy the Silence", Suede's "Trash", Keane's "Bend and Break", Kraftwerk's "Ohm Sweet Ohm" and Marilyn Manson's "Coma White". Most recently, they have covered Peter Schilling's Major Tom (Coming Home).

Members

Current members 
Stephan Groth (STP a/k/a Grothesk) – vocals, programming, guitar, samples (1989–present)
Ted Skogmann – drums, additional guitar (1999–2002, 2011–present)
Jonas Groth – keyboards, production (2009–present)
Audun Stengel (Angel) – guitar (2002–2009, 2013–present)

Former members 
Geir Bratland – keyboards, backing vocals (1995–2009)
Fredrik Brarud – drums (2002–2009)
Brandon Smith – guitar (2009)
Jon Erik Martinsen – keyboards (1989)
Per Aksel Lundgreen – keyboards (1990–1994)
Anders Odden – guitars (1992–1999, 2003–2006)
Fredrik Darum – live guitar (1999–2001)
Thomas Jakobsen – drums (2009–2011)

Live members 
 Leandra Ophelia Dax – keyboards (2010–present)

Other collaborators 
Vegard Blomberg of View
Pål Magnus Rybom of Echo Image
Claudia Brücken of Propaganda
Benji Madden of Good Charlotte
Amanda Palmer of The Dresden Dolls
Emil Nikolaisen of Serena Maneesh
Håvard Ellefsen of Mortiis
Kurt Ebelhäuser of Blackmail
Anneli Drecker of Bel Canto
Vile Electrodes

Line-up changes 
Per Aksel Lundgreen joined Apoptygma Berzerk in 1990, and remained an active member until 1994.  He has since pursued numerous other musical projects, most recently joining Rossetti's Compass as a permanent member in March 2013.

Anders Odden has been the most reoccurring member of Apop, joining in the live lineup in the early 1990s, and reappearing several times during the next 15 years, both live and in the studio.

Geir Bratland also joined in the first part of the 1990s.

In 1999, Fredrik Darum and Ted Skogman joined the band for the Welcome To Earth album and world tour.

In 2001, Fredrik and Ted were replaced with Fredrik Brarud and Angel. The 2006 release You And Me Against The World and 2009's Rocket Science, are the only albums to feature other persons than main man Stephan as part of the band (Geir Bratland, Angel, Fredrik Brarud and Anders Odden on You And Me Against The World, and without Anders on Rocket Science).

In July 2009 Angel, Geir and Fredrik departed from the Apoptygma Berzerk lineup.

In August 2009, Brandon Smith (frontman from the electronic rock band The Anix) confirmed that he was joining the band on guitar for the US and Canada legs of the upcoming tour. source- www.theanix.com

Brandon wrote on the forum saying, "This is just going to be a test run type of tour, to see how well Apop does in the US, Canada, and South America. I will be playing guitar for them on this tour."

On 3 September 2009, Stephan wrote on the official site:

In 2010, Leandra Ophelia Dax (the only female member of the band thus far) stood in for Jonas during the support tour for German band Unheilig.

In 2011, Thomas Jakobsen was replaced by Ted Skogman, and Angel came back, replacing Brandon (though Brandon has appeared live a few times after this, e.g. in Mexico City 2014).

Discography

Studio albums 
 Soli Deo Gloria (1993)
 7 (1996)
 Welcome to Earth (2000)
 Harmonizer (2002)
 You and Me Against the World (2005)
 Rocket Science (2009)
 Exit Popularity Contest (2016)
 SDGXXV (2019)

References

External links 

 
 
 Apoptygma Berzerk Metropolis Records
 
  Interview with Stephan Groth of Apoptygma Berzerk on NXLive.co.uk
  Italian Fanbase of Apoptygma Berzerk on Facebook.com

 
Norwegian rock music groups
Norwegian electronic music groups
Norwegian industrial music groups
Electronic body music groups
Norwegian synthpop groups
Norwegian pop music groups
Musical groups established in 1989
1989 establishments in Norway
Musical groups from Fredrikstad
Musical groups from Sarpsborg
Metropolis Records artists
Dependent Records artists
Futurepop music groups
GUN Records artists